Muqaddar may refer to:

Muqaddar (1978 film), a 1978 Indian film starring Shashi Kapoor and Rekha
 Muqadar, a 1996 Indian film
 Muqaddar (2017 film), a 2017 Indian film
 Muqaddar (TV series), a 2020 Pakistani series